William Thomas Francis Miller (born 9 September 1978) is an actor and singer. Of U.S. and British parentage, he has lived in the UK, the United States and mainly in Spain.

Miller studied History, Archeology and Performing Arts in Spain, and speaks English, Spanish, Catalan, and French. He is well known for working in several Spanish television series, and has played supporting roles in Spanish, Mexican, American, British and French films. He has received some good reviews on his latest works.

Miller has also worked in theatre, including classical Spanish plays and musicals, and was the frontman of the Spanish rock band Deniro for five years. He had been in a relationship with Eliza Taylor since April 2018. They stopped dating during Christmas holidays the same year by mutual consent.

Selected filmography

Films 
 Tempus fugit (2003) as Andros
 Rottweiler (2004) as Dante
 La Conjura de El Escorial (2008) as Captain Rodrigo de Villena
 Sagan (2008) as Robert Westhorff
 Sans laisser de traces (Traceless)  (2010), as Ritchie Brown
 Cinco de mayo: La batalla (2013) as Charles Ferdinand de Latrille, Conde de Lorencez
 Jim doesn't know what to say (TV movie) (2014) as Lance
 The Midnight Man (2016) as Nomack
 Megan Leavey (2016) as Constable
 Ruta Madre (Going South) (2016) as Rodrigo
 Don't Look at the Demon (2022) as Ian

Television series 
 Cuéntame cómo pasó, (La 1, 2002-2021), as Mike
 Un paso adelante,  (Antena 3, 2005), as Nacho (3 episodes)
 2 de mayo, la libertad de una nación, (Telemadrid, 2008)
 Hay alguien ahí (Cuatro, 2009–2010)
 Above suspicion (ITV, 2012), as Rupert Mitchell (2 episodes)
 Isabel (La 1, 2012-2013), as Beltrán de la Cueva
 Perception (TNT, 2014), as Cyrus Dunham (1 episode)
 Sr. Ávila (HBO, 2014), as Marco Stell (2 episodes)
 Las aventuras del Capitán Alatriste (based on Captain Alatriste) (Telecinco, 2015), as Duke of Buckingham
 La que se avecina (Telecinco, 2016), as Héctor
 The 100 (The CW, 2018), as Paxton "Graveyard" McCreary
 Señora Acero (season 5) (Telemundo, 2018-2019), as Acasio "El Teca" Martinez #2
 Warrior Nun (Netflix, 2020–present), as Adriel

References

External links 

 
 William Miller on Filmaffinity
 William Miller on Instagram

1978 births
British male actors
People from Windsor, Berkshire
Living people
Spanish film actors
Spanish television actors